Bâgé may refer to several communes in France:
 Bâgé-la-Ville, in the Ain department
 Bâgé-le-Châtel, in the Ain department